Proven oil reserves in Iran, according to its government, rank fourth largest in the world at approximately as of 2013, although it ranks third if Canadian reserves of unconventional oil are excluded. This is roughly 10% of the world's total proven petroleum reserves. At 2020 rates of production, Iran's oil reserves would last 145 years if no new oil was found.

According to NIOC, Iran recoverable liquid hydrocarbon reserves at the end of 2006 was 138.4 billion barrels. Apart from these considerable reserves, from the outset of oil industry in Iran in 1908 to the end of 2007, Iran produced some 61 billion barrels of oil.

Iran has more than a century of history in exploration and production; the first successful exploration well was Masjid Suleiman-1 on May 26, 1908. Since then, based on the latest oil and gas reports, 145 hydrocarbon fields and 297 oil and gas reservoirs have been discovered in Iran, with many fields having multiple pay zones. A total of 102 fields are oil and the remaining 43 are gas, and there are 205 oil reservoirs and 92 natural gas reservoirs. According to Iran Energy Balance Sheet (2009, in Persian), 78 of these fields are currently active, with 62 onshore and 16 offshore, leaving 67 fields inactive at present. Some 23 hydrocarbon fields lie in border areas and are shared between Iran and adjacent countries, including Kuwait, Iraq, Qatar, Bahrain, UAE, Saudi Arabia and Turkmenistan.

Iran's mature oil fields are in need of enhanced oil recovery (EOR) techniques such as gas injection to maintain production, which is declining at an annual rate of approximately 8% onshore and 10% offshore. With current technology it is only possible to extract 20% to 25% of the oil in place from Iran's fractured carbonate reservoirs, 10% less than the world average. It is estimated that 400,000-700,001 bbl/d of crude production is lost annually due to declines in the mature oil fields.

Largest oil fields 
The five biggest Iran's oil fields;

Additions to reserves

Iran oil reserves at the beginning of 2001 were reported to be about 99 billion barrels; however in 2002 the result of NIOC's study showed huge reserves upgrade adding about 31.7 billion barrels of recoverable reserves to the Iranian oil reserves.

The 2002 NIOC reserve revision came from the following sources:
 Revision of oil-in-place volume which added 14,3 billion barrels of oil to Iran's Oil in place reserves. 
 Revision of the field's recovery factors which increased average recovery factor of the revised oil fields from 29% to 36%.
 South Pars gas field liquefied petroleum gas reserves (C3 and C4) about 3,2 billion recoverable barrels.
 New discoveries about 700 million recoverable barrels.

In addition to the large reserves, Iran still has huge potential for new significant gas discoveries: areas like Caspian Sea, North East, Central Kavir and especially areas starting from Aghar and Dalan gas fields in Fars province up to the Strait of Hormuz and Central Persian Gulf have considerable amount of undiscovered gas resources. According to Exploration Directorate of NIOC, there are about 150 unexplored anticlines in Iran.

In the Zagros and Persian Gulf Basins the highly porous Cretaceous and Tertiary carbonate rocks make very important oil reservoirs, while Permo-Triassic carbonates, particularly the Dalan and Kangan formations, are the main gas and condensate reservoirs. It is reported that 38 gas/condensate pools have been discovered in the Dalan and Kangan formations in these basins alone. The mid-Cretaceous Sarvak formation is significant for the volume of recoverable oil it holds, while the Oligo-Miocene Asmari formation is the best current producer.

See also

 Petroleum industry in Iran
 North Pars
 Kish Gas Field
 Golshan Gas Field
 Ferdowsi Gas Field
 List of oil fields
 William Knox D'Arcy
 National Geoscience Database of Iran

References

External links 
 The Asmari Giant Reservoirs
 Persia Land of Black Gold
 Britain's Major Plunder of Iranian Oil in 1903

External links
Methodology in estimating the size of oil and gas fields

 
Iran
Geology of Iran